Hercules Against the Moon Men ("Maciste and the Queen of Samar") is a 1964 Franco-Italian international co-production sword and sandal film. It was directed by Giacomo Gentilomo in his final film and stars Alan Steel and Jany Clair. The English version of the film runs for 90 minutes and is dubbed.

Plot
In ancient Greece, a race of evil aliens from the Moon land on Earth. For years they have terrorized the nearby city of Samar. Hercules (Maciste in the original version) attempts to free the people of the kingdom of Samar from the rule of their evil queen. She is under the spell of invading Moon Men who demand children for sacrifice in hopes their spilled blood can revive their own dead queen.

The Queen of Samar has made a pact with the Moon Men to conquer the world and become the most powerful woman alive. The downtrodden residents of Samar cheer the arrival of the mighty Hercules, who on their behalf faces deadly obstacles, battles the Moon monsters and eventually confronts the leader of the Moon Men, Redolphis, a metal-headed giant.

Cast

 Alan Steel as Hercules/Maciste
 Jany Clair as Queen Samara
 Anna Maria Polani as Agar
 Nando Tamberlani as Gladius
 Jean-Pierre Honoré as Darix
 Delia D'Alberti as Billis / Selene (as Delia d'Alberti)
 Goffredo Unger as Mogol
 Franco Morici as Timor
 Attilio Dottesio as Remar
 Roberto Ceccacci as Redolphis
 Stefano Carletti as Mogol
 Paola Pitti as Taris (as Paola Piretti)
 Giuliano Raffaelli as Tirteo - tavernkeeper
 Anna Maria Dionisi as Tavernkeeper's wife
 Salvatore Borghese as Aggressor of Maciste upon his arrival
 Antonio Corevi as Rubio, the imperial guard officer

Production
In the original Italian-language version, the hero was not Hercules but Maciste, originally a hero in silent Italian cinema. Hercules Against the Moon Men "blends" elements from a number of mythologies. Roman, Greek, Ancient Egyptian and Cretan elements are all thrown in. Filming took place in Italy, primarily at the Cinecittà Studios, Cinecittà, Rome and in Lazio, Italy.

The term The Moon Men and the plot element of such beings seeking to conquer the Earth appeared earlier in the novel of that name by American writer Edgar Rice Burroughs, though the details of the conquest in Burroughs' book are very different from the film.

Release
Hecules Against the Moon Men was released in Italy on 27 June 1964. It was released in the United States in May 1965.

Reception
The original Italian title of Hercules Against the Moon Men was Maciste e la regina di Samar (Maciste and the Queen of Samar). The French title of the film was Maciste contre les hommes de pierre (Maciste Against the Men of Stone), but the English distributors dubbed him to be Hercules, because Maciste was not well known to American audiences. For audiences who wanted to see an accurate interpretation of the Hercules story, the film "... made little or no effort to remain faithful to antiquity."

Film historian Gary Allen Smith noted: "In this combination of peplum and science fiction, this silly, but diverting, entry has the indomitable Alan Steel (real name: Sergio Ciani) fight a collection of Moon monsters before the inevitable cataclysm destroys the invaders. In the film's one inventive touch, the sequences which take place in the mountain kingdom of the Moon Men are filmed in sepia tone, rather than full color ... or Cosmicolor, as stated in the American publicity material."

MST3K
Hercules Against the Moon Men (given as Hercules Against the Moonmen) was also shown on Mystery Science Theater 3000, making it infamous for its "Deep Hurting" Sequence (the very long sandstorm sequence). This sequence involved many of the cast floundering around pointlessly in a sandstorm for upwards of five minutes of screen time, in which no plot movement or character development is made at all. The "Deep Hurting" concept is introduced by Dr. Forrester as a follow-up to "Rock Climbing", a pain point of the movie Lost Continent that had previously been shown.

DVD releases
Hercules Against the Moon Men has received numerous 'bargain box' releases from various studios. The MST3K version of the film was released by Rhino Home Video as part of the 'Collection, Volume 7' box set.

References

Footnotes

Sources

 
 Beaulieu, Trace. The Mystery Science Theater 3000 Amazing Colossal Episode Guide. New York: Bantam Books, 1996. .
 Morford, Mark P. O. and Robert J. Lenardon. Classical Mythology. Oxford, UK: Oxford University Press, 1999. .
 Smith, Gary Allen. Epic Films: Casts, Credits and Commentary on More Than 350 Historical Spectacle Movies. Jefferson, North Carolina: McFarland & Company, 2009. .

External links
 
 

1964 films
1960s fantasy films
Italian fantasy films
Peplum films
French fantasy films
1960s Italian-language films
Films directed by Giacomo Gentilomo
Moon in film
Films about ancient astronauts
Films about Heracles
Maciste films
Sword and sandal films
1960s Italian films
1960s French films